Fluid (known in Japan as Depth) is a music video game developed by Opus and published by Sony Computer Entertainment for the PlayStation. The game's concept is an interactive sound lab which allows the player to create dance and electronic music. The player uses a dolphin character in 'Cruise Stage' to collect samples for mixing in the 'Groove Editor'.

Levels
The player goes through many stages in order to unlock more sounds, some of which including "Abyss Lair" and "Jungle Reef". Levels can be replayed and selected from the Silent Space, which contains twelve geometric shapes representing the levels "passed". The player starts in the first stage "Peace" and continues through to "Abyss", and ten other levels. Each level contains its own sound set, which can be imported into other levels on completion of the level.

Gameplay
The "Groove Editor" allows for in depth manipulation of samples collected. Several tracks can be mixed at once, controlling speed, pitch, frequency and modulation with a series of coloured crystals. Mixes can be saved to memory card, and then played during levels. Controlling the dolphin allowed the player to add improvisations during the playback sessions, frequency being mapped to the up/ down controls, and modulation to left/ right.

External links

1996 video games
Music video games
PlayStation (console) games
PlayStation (console)-only games
Sony Interactive Entertainment games
Video games developed in Japan
Video games with underwater settings